Horsepen Lake Wildlife Management Area is a  Wildlife Management Area in Buckingham County, Virginia. The area includes small streams, beaver ponds, and forests of pine, oak, and hickory. The  Horsepen Lake is also located on the property.

Horsepen Lake Wildlife Management Area is owned and maintained by the Virginia Department of Game and Inland Fisheries. The area is open to the public for hunting, trapping, fishing, hiking, horseback riding, boating, and primitive camping. Improvements include numerous parking areas, a boat launch, and a picnic shelter. Access for persons 17 years of age or older requires a valid hunting or fishing permit, a current Virginia boat registration, or a WMA access permit.

See also
 List of Virginia Wildlife Management Areas

References

External links
Virginia Department of Game and Inland Fisheries: Horsepen Lake Wildlife Management Area

Wildlife management areas of Virginia
Protected areas of Buckingham County, Virginia